Ancestors: The Humankind Odyssey is a survival game developed by Panache Digital Games and published by Private Division. It was released for Microsoft Windows, PlayStation 4, and Xbox One in August 2019. It was directed by Patrice Désilets. Set in prehistoric Africa, players control hominin species within the evolutionary lineage of modern humans, and are tasked to ensure their survival and facilitate their evolution.

Gameplay

Ancestors: The Humankind Odyssey is a survival game played from a third-person view. In the game, players control a member of a hominid clan and have to manage the player character's health by eating, drinking, and sleeping. The game starts in a jungle in prehistoric Africa, an open world filled with threats including Machairodus, Metridiochoerus, Crocodylus thorbjarnarsoni, Adcrocuta hyenas, African rock python, giant miocene otters, African buffalo, and more. Players can climb trees, and will suffer injuries if they fall down or are attacked by predators. As players progress, new areas are opened up for players to explore. When a hominid is exploring new locations or being hunted by predators, it will enter a state of "fear" which can be overcome by finding glowing orbs of light, or else it will descend into a state of hysteria.

While the world is dangerous, the apes can use their heightened senses to listen to various sounds, such as that of a predator, a lost clan member, or an outsider which can be recruited to the player's clans. The hominid can use its intelligence to pinpoint the locations of different items of interest and make new discoveries such as identifying new food or tools. As players continue to make new discoveries, the hominid become more intelligent and capable, and new skills such as using leaves to make bedding and medicinal plants to heal themselves are unlocked. If the player character dies, players will shift to controlling another clan member. If all clan members die, the lineage becomes extinct and players need to restart the game.

The goal of the player is to ensure the hominid clan's survival as it slowly evolves and becomes a new species. As the clan grows, players can switch to play as other characters such as an infant, an adult, an elder, and a mother carrying her child. As the clan slowly expands, the player character can perform social tasks like calling members of the clan to hunt and explore together, or migrating across the map to settle down in a new home. When an ape is sleeping, players can unlock new abilities by developing the hominid's neural system, which functions as a skill tree. These skills, such as the ability to use both hands and stand upright, facilitate evolution. As hominids undergo procreation, unlocked skills are passed on to future generations. The game is 40 to 50 hours long, and it documents the clan's evolution across eight million years.

Development

The game was developed by Panache Digital Games, a studio opened in 2014 by game director Patrice Désilets after he left Ubisoft. Désilets focused on creating a toolbox for his new studio, which allowed characters to interact with the environment extensively. The team intended to create a game set in prehistory so they did not need to build vast cities for players to explore. According to Désilets, he was "bored of the whole 10,000 BC [setting]", so he opted to create a game set ten million years in the past. To better study the setting, Désilets read books about paleoanthropology, though some elements were exaggerated. The team avoided getting inspirations from films or other pop culture media to ensure that the game was unique instead of derivative.

Désilets designed the game to allow players to explore the game's various systems and features, which prompted them to use their instincts to look for solutions. The game does not have a structured narrative campaign, as Désilets hoped that players can craft their own experiences. The team avoided including a mini-map as part of the game's head-up display as the team wanted to encourage players to have the curiosity to freely explore the game's world. Désilets envisioned the game as the first part of a trilogy, and that this first title will end when the player character reaches a stage that resembles Lucy.

The game was announced at Reboot Develop 2015 in Dubrovnik by Désilets. Initially, the game was episodic, in which each chapter enabled players to "relive the greatest moments of mankind with a documentary twist". The decision was a financial one because the studio was small and it lacked sufficient funds to build a huge game. However, the plan was scrapped after Private Division, a new publishing label dedicated to supporting independent game developers, agreed to publish the game. The game was released for Microsoft Windows on August 27, 2019 via the Epic Games Store due to an exclusivity deal that would last for a year. The PlayStation 4 and Xbox One versions were released on December 6 of the same year. It was also released on the Steam store in August 2020.

Reception

The game received mixed reviews from critics according to review aggregator Metacritic.

The game was nominated for "Best International Indie Game" at the Pégases Awards 2020.

The game sold 1 million copies.

References

External links
 

2019 video games
Survival video games
Open-world video games
Take-Two Interactive games
PlayStation 4 games
Video games developed in Canada
Video games set in Africa
Video games set in prehistory
Windows games
Xbox One games
Single-player video games
Unreal Engine games
Private Division games
Video games about evolution
Video games about primates